Xiao San (10 October 1896 – 4 February 1983) was a Chinese poet and translator. He was fluent in Russian, French, German, and English.

Xiao San was the first writer to write a biography of Mao Zedong.

Names
His birthname was Xiao Kesen. His style name was Zizhang, his given name was Xiao Chunsan, and he also known as Xiao Zhifan. His pen name included Emi Siao and Tianguang.

Biography
Xiao was born Xiao Kesen in Xiangxiang, Hunan, on October 10, 1896, the second son of Xiao Yueying, a Chinese educator. He had an elder brother, Xiao Zisheng (1894-1976), a Chinese educator and scholar.

Xiao San attended Dongshan School and Dongshan High School. He graduated from Hunan First Normal University, where he studied alongside Mao Zedong, Cai Hesen, and his brother Xiao Zisheng.  In 1918, he founded New People's Study Society with Mao Zedong, Cai Hesen, and Xiao Zisheng. In 1920, he traveled to France for the Work-Study Program. He joined the Communist Party of China in 1922. In 1923, he went to Moscow to studied at Communist University of the Toilers of the East. He returned to China in 1924 and served as Secretary of Hunan Provincial Committee of the Communist Youth League of China. He suffered a concussion and got rest in Vladivostok in 1928, he studied at Moscow Sun Yat-sen University and then taught at Far Eastern Federal University. Xiao returned to China in 1939 and worked in Yan'an, he once served in various political roles in the Communist Party's government. In April 1945, he attended at the 7th National Congress of the Communist Party of China.

Xiao was arrested by the Chinese government in 1961 during the Sino-Soviet split. In June 1967, he and his wife Eva Sandberg were thrown into Qincheng Prison, they were released in October 1974. He was politically rehabilitated in 1979 by Hu Yaobang and died in Beijing on February 4, 1983.

Works
 Mao Zedong's Early Years
 The Road to Peace
 The Song of Friendship
 Selected Poems of Xiao San
 Precious Memory
 Collected Works of Xiao San

Personal life

Xiao San married four times. He married his first wife Tan Xuejun in his hometown at the age of 18; she died in 1922 in Changsha after their daughter died young. By age 31, he married a 25-year-old Russian girl named Vassar in Vladivostok, and soon divorced. His third wife, Eva Sandberg (1911-2001), was a Jewish German photographer; they married in 1935 in the Soviet Union. He married his fourth wife Gan Lu (her birthname was Jiang Deliang ) in October 1944 in Yan'an; they divorced in September 1950.

He had three sons with Eva Sandberg, two sons with Gan Lu, and one son with Vassa Starodubtseva.

With Vassa Starodubtseva:

 Allan Starodub (born 1927)

With Eva Sandberg:

 Xiao Li'ang (born 1938)
 Xiao weijia (born 1943)
 Xiao Heping (born 1950)

With Gan Lu:

 Xiao Tieta (born February 1946)
 Xiao Ganping

References

1896 births
1983 deaths
People from Xiangxiang
Hunan First Normal University alumni
Communist University of the Toilers of the East alumni
Moscow Sun Yat-sen University alumni
Burials at Babaoshan Revolutionary Cemetery
Writers from Hunan